Cajal:
 Santiago Ramón y Cajal, Spanish histologist, physician, pathologist
 Fortún Garcés Cajal, medieval Spanish nobleman
 Nicolae Cajal (1919–2004), Romanian Jewish physician, academic, politician, philanthropist 
 Cajal Institute, a neuroscience research center in Madrid, Spain.
 Cajal cells
 Cajal–Retzius cell
 Interstitial cell of Cajal (ICC)
 Cajal bodies (CBs)
 Cajal (crater), a tiny lunar impact crater